Suchusqa (Quechua suchuy to slide, -sqa a suffix, "slidden", also spelled Suchuskha) is a mountain in the Bolivian Andes which reaches a height of approximately . It is located in the Potosí Department, Antonio Quijarro Province, Porco Municipality, southwest of Porco.

References 

Mountains of Potosí Department